Bilal Hussein . Born 22 April 2000) is a Swedish footballer who plays as a midfielder for AIK.

Professional career
Hussein began playing football with his local club Bromstens IK at the age of 7, and joined the AIK youth academy in 2014. On 20 January 2018, Hussein signed his first professional contract with AIK, keeping him at the club until 2021. He made his professional debut for AIK in a 2–0 Allsvenskan win over IK Sirius on 27 April 2018.

International career
Hussein was born in Sweden to Somali parents. He is a youth international for Sweden. He made his full international debut for Sweden on 9 January 2023, replacing Hugo Larsson 68 minutes into a friendly 2–0 win against Finland.

Career statistics

Club
As of match played 6 November 2022

International

References

External links
 
 
 
 AIK profile 
 

2000 births
Living people
Footballers from Stockholm
Swedish footballers
Sweden international footballers
Sweden youth international footballers
Swedish people of Somali descent
Allsvenskan players
AIK Fotboll players
Vasalunds IF players
Association football midfielders